Carlos Eduardo Francisco Lozada Rodriguez Pastor (born November 1, 1971) is a Peruvian-American journalist and author and was the nonfiction book critic of The Washington Post. In Sept. 2022, he became an opinion columnist for The New York Times. He won the Pulitzer Prize for Criticism in 2019 and was a finalist in 2018. The Pulitzer Board cited his "trenchant and searching reviews and essays that joined warm emotion and careful analysis in examining a broad range of books addressing government and the American experience." He received the 2015 National Book Critics Circle Nona Balakian Citation for Excellence in Reviewing. Lozada is an adjunct professor of political science and journalism for the University of Notre Dame's Washington program. He is the author of What Were We Thinking: A Brief Intellectual History of the Trump Era, published in October 2020 by Simon & Schuster.

Early life
Lozada was born in Lima, Peru, and migrated to California with his family as a child. He later returned to Peru, where he lived until completing high school. He earned a bachelor's degree in economics and political science from the University of Notre Dame in 1993. In 1997, he graduated from the Woodrow Wilson School of Public and International Affairs at Princeton University with a master's degree in public administration. After graduation, Lozada worked as an economic analyst at the Federal Reserve Bank of Atlanta in Atlanta, Georgia. He is married and has 3 children. He is the nephew of businessman and politician Carlos Rodriguez-Pastor Sr. and cousin of billionaire businessman Carlos Rodriguez-Pastor.

Career
In 1999, Lozada became an editor of Foreign Policy  in Washington D.C., eventually becoming the magazine's managing editor. Lozada was a 2004–2005 Knight-Bagehot Fellow in Business and Economics Journalism at Columbia University in New York. He joined the staff of The Washington Post in 2005 and served as economics editor, national security editor and Outlook editor. He became the paper's nonfiction book critic in 2015.

Lozada joined the University of Notre Dame Faculty in 2009 as an adjunct professor for the Washington Program, and teaches a seminar on American Political Journalism. He was elected to the Pulitzer Prize Board in November 2019.

References

External links

Peruvian journalists
Male journalists
American people of Peruvian descent
Living people
American political journalists
The Washington Post people
American male journalists
American newspaper journalists
Writers from Lima
Princeton School of Public and International Affairs alumni
1971 births
Pulitzer Prize for Criticism winners
21st-century American journalists
21st-century American male writers

Notre Dame College of Arts and Letters alumni